Dejan Stefanović (Serbian Cyrillic: Дејан Стефановић; born 28 October 1974) is a Serbian retired professional footballer.

Early life
While growing up, Stefanović supported Milan and idolized defender Franco Baresi, which inspired him to become a footballer.

Club career

Red Star Belgrade
Stefanović began his career in his home town with Dinamo Vranje before being signed by Red Star Belgrade. Whilst at the club he made his international debut for FR Yugoslavia, aged 20, against Hong Kong in January 1995.

Sheffield Wednesday
During the 1995–96 season, English club Sheffield Wednesday signed Stefanović and his compatriot, striker Darko Kovačević. Stefanović cost the English club £2 million. However, Stefanović struggled to break into the Wednesday side with Emerson Thome and Des Walker among those ahead of him in the pecking order.

In 1998–99, after playing 72 games for the club, Stefanović was released on a free transfer after he failed to make enough first-team appearances to qualify for a work permit extension.

Vitesse
In August 1999, Stefanović moved to Dutch club Vitesse, joining three of his compatriots: goalkeeper Dragoslav Jevrić, midfielder Nenad Grozdić, and striker Dejan Čurović. Stefanović spent four years at the club, becoming captain during that time. At Vitesse he played 13 UEFA Cup matches.

Portsmouth
At the start of the 2003–04 season, Stefanović returned to England with Premiership newcomers Portsmouth for £1.85 million. He established himself as a first-choice defender during the club's first season in the top-flight, and was a regular in the 2004–05 campaign, winning the fans' Player of the season award. He was made Portsmouth captain by Alain Perrin in the 2005–06 season, although a dip in form and a habit of speaking out to the press earned him the ire of some supporters. Indeed, he confessed to "not giving 100%" under Perrin due to disliking the French coach, comments criticised as highly unprofessional by some fans.

Stefanović's influence on chairman (and fellow Serbian) Milan Mandarić is said to have been an important factor in the dismissal of Perrin and the re-appointment of Harry Redknapp, and he was an important member of the side that ensured Premiership survival at Wigan in the penultimate game of the season.

Stefanović was converted to a left-back at the start of 2006–07 and was a mainstay of the defence that performed so well for Portsmouth during the season. However, the arrivals of Hermann Hreiðarsson and Sylvain Distin during the summer of 2007 cast his position as a first team regular into doubt and he was replaced as captain by Sol Campbell for the 2007–08 season.

Fulham
In August 2007, Scottish club Rangers revealed an interest in signing Stefanović but he signed for Fulham.

Norwich City
Having spent less than a year at Craven Cottage, Stefanović dropped down a division to join Norwich City on 18 July 2008, agreeing a two-year deal.

After twelve starts for the Canaries, during which he picked up one red card, Stefanović ruptured his cruciate knee ligaments and did not play again for Norwich City in the 2008–09 season.

In August 2009, it was reported that Stefanović was in negotiations to leave Norwich, with the player wishing to return to the south of England. On 1 September 2009, his contract was terminated by mutual consent.

Retirement and return to football
Stefanović retired in late 2009 due to a knee injury. He remained living in the Portsmouth area and on one occasion admitted his dreams of managing Portsmouth one day.

On 7 October 2010 Stefanović joined Havant & Waterlooville.

Controversies
In September 2006, Stefanović caused controversy when he said that he will throw away his Serbian passport as soon as he gets his British passport as he does not feel like a Serb any longer.

International career
Stefanović is a full Serbia and Montenegro international, earning his first call-up in 1995 (the country was then known as Yugoslavia, changing to Serbia and Montenegro in 2003). He has a total of 20 caps to his name. Stefanović retired from international football in 2004.

Career statistics

References

External links

1974 births
Living people
People from Vranje
Serbian footballers
Serbia and Montenegro footballers
Serbia and Montenegro international footballers
Association football defenders
Red Star Belgrade footballers
FK Radnički Beograd players
Sheffield Wednesday F.C. players
SBV Vitesse players
Portsmouth F.C. players
Fulham F.C. players
Norwich City F.C. players
Premier League players
Eredivisie players
Expatriate footballers in England
Expatriate footballers in the Netherlands
Serbia and Montenegro expatriate footballers
Serbian expatriate footballers
Serbia and Montenegro expatriate sportspeople in England
Serbia and Montenegro expatriate sportspeople in the Netherlands
Serbian expatriate sportspeople in England